The 1967 Primera División season was the 76th season of top-flight football in Argentina. It was the first season in which the Metropolitano and Nacional championships format was used.

Estudiantes (LP) (2nd title) won the Metropolitano while Independiente won the Nacional tournament (8th title). At the end of the Reclasificatorio, Unión de Santa Fe and Deportivo Español were relegated.

Campeonato Metropolitano 

The "Campeonato Metropolitano" was the first championship of the season. It was contested between twenty-two teams directed affiliated with the Argentine Football Association from March 3 to August 6.

The format championship was in two rounds. The first round saw the 22 teams divided into two groups of 11. They would play within that group in a double round-robin format. In addition, they would play one team in the other group twice (the other team typically being a traditional rival). The top two teams in each group would advance to the semifinals and qualify for the Campeonato Nacional, the next four teams would qualify to the Campeonato Nacional, the next two teams would go to the Promocional tournament, and the bottom three teams would go to the Reclasificatorio. The four teams qualified to the semifinals would then compete in a one leg, single elimination tournament.

Estudiantes de La Plata won the Metropolitano under the leadership of Osvaldo Zubeldía. It was their second Primera División. Paraguayan Bernardo Acosta of Lanús finished as the top goalscorer with 18 goals.

Classification round

Group A

Group B

Semifinals

Final

Match details

Torneo Reclasificatorio 
The "Reclasificatorio" was a promotion and relegation tournament between the bottom six teams from the Campeonato Metropolitano (teams qualified 9th, 10th and 11th in each zone) and the top four teams from the Primera B), playing in a double round-robin system. It ran from 11 August to 23 December.

At the end of the Reclasificatorio, the top six teams would stay/be promoted in Primera División, while the bottom four teams would remain/be relegated to Primera B. This tournament was won by Newell's Old Boys but did not award an official title.

Torneo Promocional 
The "Torneo Promocional" was an extra tournament played between four teams from the Campeonato Metropolitano (qualified 7th. and 8th. in each zone) and the four runners-up of Torneo Regional. This competition run from 10 September to 10 December and was won by Gimnasia y Esgrima de La Plata, but did not award an official title.

Top scorers

Campeonato Nacional 

The 1967 Campeonato Nacional was the second and last championship of the season. It was played between September 8 to December 17.

The format for the Nacional was a single round-robin tournament. The team with the highest points at the end would be the champion. The champion and runner-up would qualify to the 1968 Copa Libertadores. Sixteen teams played in the Nacional: twelve qualified from the Metropolitano, and four qualified from the Regional Tournament. They are: San Martín (Mendoza), San Lorenzo (Mar del Plata), Central Córdoba (Santiago del Estero) and Chaco For Ever.

Independiente won the Campeonato Nacional achieving their 8th league title. They were led by Oswaldo Brandao and their own Luis Artime was the top goalscorer with 11 goals.

Standings

Top scorers

References

Argentine Primera División seasons
p
p
Argentine Primera Division
1